Daniele Soro (born  October 18 1975, Cagliari, Italy) is a professional Italian basketball player.

References

Italian men's basketball players
Living people
1975 births
Sportspeople from Cagliari
Point guards